Twin Falls State Resort Park is a state park in Wyoming County, West Virginia. The park was opened in 1968 and was completed by 1975.  The two namesake waterfalls are accessed by a hiking trail and are located about 1/2-mile apart on the Marsh and Black Forks of Cabin Creek.

The park is built on land donated by Pocahontas Land Corporation and Western Pocahontas Land Corporation as well as a few small privately owned plots.

The park's nature center, located in Twin Falls Lodge, features local and natural history displays and offers naturalist-led programs year round.

Features 
 Twin Falls Lodge with 47 guest rooms
 14 cottages
 Restaurant
 Nature center
 Gift shop
 18 hole golf course
 50 site campground (25 with RV hook-ups)
 Picnic grounds
 Hiking
 Mountain Biking
 Tennis court
 Basketball court
 Volleyball court
 Indoor Pool Facility
 Fitness Center
 Bowers Ridge Pioneer Farm – a restored 1830s mountain homestead working farm

See also 

List of West Virginia state parks
State park

References

External links 
 

Campgrounds in West Virginia
Golf clubs and courses in West Virginia
History museums in West Virginia
Museums in Wyoming County, West Virginia
Natural history museums in West Virginia
Nature centers in West Virginia
Protected areas established in 1964
Protected areas of Wyoming County, West Virginia
Resorts in West Virginia
State parks of West Virginia
IUCN Category III